Mario Scirea (born 7 August 1964) is an Italian former racing cyclist.

Career
Scirea was a professional for 15 years, riding with six different teams throughout his career. He rode in 29 Grand Tours between 1989 and 2004. He also rode in the team time trial event at the 1988 Summer Olympics. From 1996 until the end of his career in 2004, he rode with Mario Cipollini and was a key member of Cipollini's legendary sprint train.

Scirea's only major victory was in 1987, when he won the World Time Trial Team Championships with teammates Roberto Fortunato, Eros Poli and Flavio Vanzella. He also finished second in the same event the previous year.

His only notable win as a professional was stage two of the Hofbrau Cup in 1996.

Major results
1986
 2nd World Time Trial Team Championships
1987
 1st  World Time Trial Team Championships (with Roberto Fortunato, Eros Poli and Flavio Vanzella)
1996
 1st Stage 2 Hofbrau Cup

Grand Tour general classification results timeline

References

External links
 

1964 births
Living people
Italian male cyclists
Olympic cyclists of Italy
Cyclists at the 1988 Summer Olympics
Cyclists from the Province of Bergamo
UCI Road World Champions (elite men)